Shewale is a surname. Notable people with the surname include:

Rahul Shewale (born 1973), Indian politician

Indian surnames